The 2015–16 Japan Figure Skating Championships was held on December 24–27, 2015 at the Makomanai Sekisui Heim Ice Arena in Sapporo. It was the 84th edition of the event. Medals were awarded in the disciplines of men's singles, ladies' singles, pair skating, and ice dancing.

Results

Men

Ladies
Nakashio withdrew due to injury sustained during practice before the Short Program was held.

Pair skating

Ice dancing

Japan Junior Figure Skating Championships
The 2015–16 Junior Championships took place on November 21–23, 2015 in Hitachinaka, Ibaraki. Medals were awarded in men's singles, ladies' singles, and ice dancing. There was no junior pairs event during the Junior Championship. The junior pairs event was held during the senior competition on December 24–27, 2015.

Men

Ladies

Pairs

Ice dancing

International team selections
Based on the results of the National Championships, as well as international ISU-sanctioned competitions, the Japan Skating Federation selected the following skaters for international competitions in the second half of the 2015–16 season.

World Championships

Four Continents Championships

World Junior Championships

Winter Youth Olympics

References

External links
 Japan Skating Federation results & data

Japan Figure Skating Championships
Japan Championships
Figure Skating Championships